This is a list of artistic and creative occupations related to the creation of artistic displays.

Accessory designer
Advertising designer
Animator
Architect
Art administrator

Art therapist
Artisan
Arts administration
 
Baker
Ceramics artist
Chief creative officer

Colorist
Comedian
Concept Artist
Curator
Dancer
Design director
Design strategist

Essayist
Event planner
Fashion designer
Fine artist

Floral designer

Game designer
Graphic designer
Hairstylist
Illustrator
Interior designer
Jewellery designer
Lyricist
Make-up artist

Marine designer
Media designer
Musician
Party planner
Penciller
Photographer
Photojournalist
Potter

Production designer

Sculptor
Set decorator
Set dresser
Singer
Tattoo artist

Web designer
Wedding planner
Writer

Art